Daveys Bay is a small shallow bay of Port Phillip, located in Victoria, Australia.  It is one of several small bays adjoining the town of Mount Eliza and is the closest region of the Shire of Mornington Peninsula to Melbourne.

Daveys Bay is named after James Davey who built a jetty at the western end of the bay in the 1840s.  Davey used the jetty to load his ketch with produce destined for the Melbourne markets.  Davey's Bay Yacht Club, founded in 1909, is located at the jetty.

The north-eastern shoreline of Daveys Bay features an exposure of the Manyung Fault, part of the main Selwyn Fault system.

References

External links
 Davey's Bay Yacht Club

Port Phillip
Mornington Peninsula